Berryton may refer to:

Berryton, Georgia
Berryton, Kansas

See also
Berrytown (disambiguation)